Heterosperma pinnatum, the wingpetal, is a New World species of plants in the sunflower family.  It has a discontinuous distribution in North and South America, having been found in Bolivia, Venezuela, Mexico, Guatemala, Honduras, and the south-western United States (Arizona, New Mexico, western Texas, southern Colorado),

References

External links
Photo of herbarium specimen at Missouri Botanical Garden, collected in Guatemala in 2008

Flora of Central America
Flora of North America
Flora of South America
Coreopsideae
Plants described in 1796
Taxa named by Antonio José Cavanilles